Miroslav Gono (born 1 November 2000) is a Slovak professional footballer who plays as a midfielder for Ekstraklasa club Wisła Płock, on loan from MŠK Žilina.

Club career

MŠK Žilina
Gono made his Fortuna Liga debut for Žilina against iClinic Sereď at pod Zoborom on 7 March 2020. He came on as a replacement for Enis Fazlagikj, spending over 20 minutes on the pitch, with final score already set at 0:3 for Šošoni.

Loan to Wisła Płock
On 2 September 2022, he joined Polish side Wisła Płock on a season-long loan, reuniting with his former manager Pavol Staňo.

References

External links
 MŠK Žilina official club profile
 
 Futbalnet profile
 

2000 births
Living people
Sportspeople from Piešťany
Slovak footballers
Slovakia youth international footballers
Slovakia under-21 international footballers
Association football midfielders
MŠK Žilina players
Wisła Płock players
2. Liga (Slovakia) players
Slovak Super Liga players
Ekstraklasa players
Slovak expatriate footballers
Expatriate footballers in Poland
Slovak expatriate sportspeople in Poland